Silvery kingfisher has been split into the following species:
 Southern silvery kingfisher, 	Ceyx argentatus
 Northern silvery kingfisher,  Ceyx flumenicola

Animal common name disambiguation pages